Apantesis ornata, the ornate tiger moth or  achaia moth, is a moth of the family Erebidae. It was described by Alpheus Spring Packard in 1864. It is found in western North America from southern British Columbia through the Pacific Northwest to southern California, northern Utah, and western Wyoming and Montana. It is found in a wide range of habitats, including open woodland.

The length of the forewings is 18.6 mm. The ground colour of the forewings is black with pale yellowish or pinkish-buff band. The hindwings are pale to bright yellow, orange or scarlet with black markings. Adults are on wing from mid-May to late June. Although records from August and September may indicate a partial second generation.

The larvae feed on various herbaceous plants. The larvae are covered with long black hairs dorsally and laterally and with red hairs ventrally. It has a yellow-orange middorsal line.

This species was formerly a member of the genus Grammia, but was moved to Apantesis along with the other species of the genera Grammia, Holarctia, and Notarctia.

References

 

Arctiina
Moths described in 1864